Bancaribe is a private bank based in Caracas, Venezuela that operates as a universal bank. , it was the seventh largest bank in the country and was part of the medium stratum of the Bank Ranking of the Superintendent of the Institutions of the Banking Sector of Venezuela (SUDEBAN).

 it had 100 branches located throughout the country, more than 1,200,000 customers, about 17,000 POS terminals, and more than 1,500 employees. Its current headquarters are located in Caracas, in the Galipán Business Center.

History 
Banco del Caribe (as it was formerly known) was founded on February 12, 1954 with headquarters in Puerto Cabello  working as a credit institution, starting the operations on November 3. In 1955, Bancaribe expanded its presence when it opened new branches in Barquisimeto and Barinas; then in 1956 it opened two more branches in Valencia, two in Morón and another one in Puerto Cabello. In 1957: San Felipe, Valle de La Pascua, Maracay, Calabozo, San Fernando de Apure, Punto Fijo, Guacara, El Tocuyo, Chivacoa and Guanare. In 1958: Caracas and Acarigua, Villa de Cura, La Victoria, Güigue and Cagua. In 1959 another branch in Caracas y one in Anaco. In 1961, Turén and Nirgua.

In 1963 Bancaribe decided to move the headquarters to Caracas. This expansion process allowed it to be a pioneer in the development of new financial products and services, being the first local bank in providing online services in the branches, offering the Cheque Conforme Bancaribe service, check certifying by phone and Caribe Cash, cash withdrawal through ATMs.

Besides, it actively participated in the creation of Suiche 7B, the first system to interconnect ATMs throughout the country, as well as the foundation of Consorcio Credicard, the first credit card operator in the country. In 1976, Bancaribe created an off shore bank in Curaçao, called Bancaribe Curazao Bank, N. V.

In 1997 Bancaribe became a Universal Bank, merging with its subsidiaries "Banco de Inversión del Caribe" and "Fondo de Activos Líquidos del Caribe". Bancaribe made a strategic partnership with Scotiabank, a Canadian bank with extensive experience in international finances, as well as a correspondent agreement and commercial exchange with "Caixa de Galicia".

Banco de Desarrollo Bangente is also a part of Grupo Bancaribe since 1998, when it was founded.

Bancaribe changed the headquarters located in the downtown of Caracas between 2008 and 2009, after obtaining a new building in Galipán Business Center in El Rosal, Caracas.

Board of Directors 
In March 2018, was named the Board of Directors to the period 2018-2020:

 Juan Carlos Dao
 Néstor Blanco
 Javier A. Serebriski
 Martín Pérez B.
 Luis Eduardo Paul
 Eduardo Rafael Henríquez
 Arturo Ganteaume
 Carlos Hernández Delfino
 Nelson David Dao

References

Banks established in 1954
Banks of Venezuela
Companies listed on the Caracas Stock Exchange
Venezuelan companies established in 1954
Venezuelan brands
Companies based in Caracas